Michael Geoffrey Harwood (born 8 January 1959) is an Australian professional golfer.

Harwood was born in Sydney. He turned professional in 1979 and has extensive experience on the PGA Tour of Australasia and the European Tour. His first Australian title was the 1986 Australian PGA Championship. He won five times in Europe, first being the 1988 Portuguese Open, his second European Tour victory in 1989 was the PLM Open in Sweden. In 1990, his first of three major Europe wins was the European Tour's flagship tournament at Wentworth, which was then called the Volvo PGA Championship, later that year he won the Volvo Masters at Valderrama, two weeks later in Australia he won the West End South Australian Open by five strokes. He achieved a career best European Tour Order of Merit ranking of sixth that year.

The following year, 1991, he was runner-up to fellow Australian Ian Baker-Finch at the Open Championship at Royal Birkdale, several weeks later he won the GA European Open at Walton Heath. In his prime, he played occasionally in the United States but he never had a top-10 finish in any PGA Tour event other than the Open Championship. In late 1991, Harwood achieved his highest world ranking of 20 overall. His round of 61 at the Australian PGA Championship at Concord in 1992 was his best professional score recorded. Prior to joining the European Senior Tour Harwood served as a board member of the Australian PGA in the early 2000s.

Harwood won his first title on the European Senior Tour at the season ending OKI Castellón Senior Tour Championship by three strokes. The win caused Harwood to finish 9th on the 2009 final money list and earned him the title of Rookie of the Year. Despite over 100 Pro-Am victories, it marked his first professional tournament win in 18 years. He again finished in the top-10 of the European Senior Tour Order of Merit in 2011.

Harwood won the Order of Merit and Rookie of the year honours on the Australian Senior Tour (PGA Legends Tour) in 2009. He won the Order of Merit a second time in 2015, by a significant margin. He has won over 75 events on the senior tour including the Australian Open, Australian PGA Championship and twice winning the TPC Championship.

In 2019, he won the first two event of season, the Victorian Senior Masters and Victorian Senior PGA Championship.

He also won 2019 Legend Tour Player of year.

Professional wins (34)

European Tour wins (5)

PGA Tour of Australasia wins (2)

Swedish Golf Tour wins (1)

Other wins (4)
1984 Fijian Open, Pacific Harbour Open (Fiji), Western Samoan Open
1996 Victorian PGA Championship

European Senior Tour wins (1)

Other senior wins (21)
2009 Australian Senior Open, Tasmanian Senior Open, NSW PGA Championship
2010 NZ Handa PGA Championship, Tasmanian Senior Open, Queensland PGA Senior Championship
2011 City of South Perth Masters Pro Am (Asia Pacific Champions Tour), NSW PGA Championship
2012 Australian PGA Seniors Championship, Tasmanian Senior Open, Sri Lankan Airlines Senior Golf Masters
2013 Victorian Senior Open, TPC Championship
2015 Tasmanian Senior Open, SA PGA Senior Championship, Fijian Senior Open, NSW PGA Championship
2016 Tasmanian Senior Open
2018 Australian Legends Tour Championship
2019 Victorian Senior PGA, Victorian Masters

Results in major championships

Note: Harwood never played in the Masters Tournament.

CUT = missed the half-way cut
"T" = tied

Team appearances
World Cup (representing Australia): 1984, 1991
Dunhill Cup (representing Australia): 1991
Four Tours World Championship (representing Australasia): 1991

References

External links

Australian male golfers
PGA Tour of Australasia golfers
European Tour golfers
European Senior Tour golfers
1959 births
Living people